Golem100 is  science fiction novel by American writer Alfred Bester.  Currently out of print, it was published by Simon & Schuster in 1980. It was based on Bester's short story "The Four-Hour Fugue".

Plot introduction
In a city of the future, a group of bored wealthy women begin dabbling in ancient satanic rituals, unaware that their rites are actually working.  The beast of pure evil, Golem100, is raised each time the group practices their ritual, embarking on a rampage of rape, torture and murder.  The demon is tracked through the physical and spirit worlds by Gretchen Nunn, a master of psychodynamics; Blaise Shima, a brilliant and famous chemist; and a clever local police officer, Subadar Ind'dni.

Critical response

Arthur D. Hlavaty, an editor of The New York Review of Science Fiction, wrote that Bester returned to writing science fiction "in the Seventies, only to give an unintentional example of his own theme of the unrecoverability of the past. His long-awaited novel, variously called The Indian Giver, Extro, and The Computer Connection, was a major disappointment—a confused farrago of old ideas and gimmicks. The next one, Golem100, was worse, nasty as well as incoherent. Bester seemed to be haranguing his audience about the general evil of humanity and—a theme that had been much more tangential before—the war of the sexes. Either he had now decided to give the message straight, or he felt that the Jack Gaughan illustrations—the best part of the book—provided enough dazzlement and enchantment by themselves. (Charles Platt informs me that Bester provided his own illos, but there were copyright problems. In any event, his talent had decayed to the point where he could no longer get his message across in mere words.)"

Kirkus Reviews wrote, "Outrageous, erratic, brilliant Bester is back--with a generous, ultimately unsatisfying mix of fantasy, occult, science-fiction, and psycho-babble... There is much to be admired in this fantasy--its satire and spontaneity--but somewhere along the line the high spirits congeal into massive self-indulgence and an attractively literate talent slips into doggerel. A juicy curiosity that only diehard golem-watchers will want to see through to the mangled finale."

China Miéville described it as "an extraordinary, troublesome, sometimes sadistic work that will shock you with its grotesquerie and sexual violence, but also, with a less uneasy tremor, with its disrespect for text. Several early pages are taken up by a musical score, but Chapter 13 is the revelation. It is structured by Jack Gaughan's full-page illustrations, around and through which words must find their way. The images are the engine, organizing what language there is, invoking awe and, on the last page, an irruption of sudden textless terror... [a] nastily visionary S.F. dystopia." David Langford called the book "truly dire."

References

  

1980 American novels
1980 science fiction novels
Novels by Alfred Bester